Merrion Street Gardens is a city square and gardens in central Leeds, West Yorkshire, United Kingdom, owned by Wade's Charity and was opened to the public in 1932 in memorial of Thomas Wade.

The square is situated on the south east corner of Merrion Street and Wade Lane, adjacent to St John's Church, the oldest surviving church in the city.

References

1932 establishments in England
Geography of West Yorkshire
Parks and commons in Leeds